Víšek is a surname. Notable people with the surname include:

 Jan Víšek (born 1981), Czech ice hockey player
 Tomáš Víšek (born 1957), Czech pianist

Czech-language surnames